"How Do You Sleep?" is a song by English singer Sam Smith, released on 19 July 2019. Smith co-wrote the song with Savan Kotecha, Max Martin and Ilya, the latter of whom produced the song. The song appears on Smith's third studio album Love Goes (2020).

Critical reception
Rolling Stone described the song as a "pop ballad about trying to move on".

Music video
The music video was released alongside the song on 19 July. It was directed by Grant Singer, with choreography by Parris Goebel, and features Smith dancing with a troupe of shirtless male dancers wearing waist trainers.

Promotion
Smith posted on their social media accounts on 9 July that they had an announcement to make the following day. The pre-order link became active on 10 July, and later the same day, Smith formally announced and shared a clip of the song. The song is featured on Now That's What I Call Music! 104 in the UK.

Charts

Weekly charts

Year-end charts

Certifications

Release history

References

2019 singles
2019 songs
Sam Smith (singer) songs
Universal Music Group singles
Capitol Records singles
Songs written by Sam Smith (singer)
Songs written by Savan Kotecha
Songs written by Max Martin
Songs written by Ilya Salmanzadeh
Song recordings produced by Ilya Salmanzadeh
Pop ballads
2010s ballads
Vertically-oriented music videos